Merriell Allesandro Shelton (January 21, 1922 – May 3, 1993) was a United States Marine who served in the Pacific theater during World War II. He is depicted in the 1981 memoir With the Old Breed: At Peleliu and Okinawa by Eugene Sledge which chronicled their combat experiences. He was also depicted in the HBO miniseries The Pacific (2010), in which he is portrayed by Rami Malek.

Biography

Early life
Merriell Shelton was born on January 21, 1922, in Louisiana, to Joseph Price Shelton and Ann/Anna (Sherwood) Shelton. He had four older brothers, and one older sister. Of Cajun descent, Shelton was described as speaking with a "thick accent".  He served in the Civilian Conservation Corps in his youth.

Military career
Shelton enlisted in the Marine Corps in 1942 and completed boot camp in San Diego. He was assigned to K Company, 3rd Battalion, 5th Marines, 1st Marine Division (K/3/5) and served as a mortar man. He participated in the Battle of Cape Gloucester alongside Romus Burgin.

In the book The Marines at Peleliu, 1944--The Bloodiest Battle of the Pacific War, author Bill Sloan describes Shelton as a "whiz at poker, but otherwise his talents involved getting confused, lost, in trouble, and generally fouled up. He would argue about anything at the slightest opportunity, and when he was agitated or inebriated, all those tendencies grew more pronounced. They were also magnified by Shelton's inability to speak understandable English at such times".
Sloan also describes how Shelton gained his nickname of "Snafu" after a fellow Marine asked him how much money he had while they were on a train in Melbourne:
 "I t'ink I got maybe aroun' two pounds and ten ounces-plenty for some drinks an' poker, eh?" to which Burgin replied, "You know what you are, Shelton? You're just one big snafu lookin' for a place to happen"

He met replacement Eugene Sledge on Pavuvu; and the two saw action under the command of Andrew Haldane during the Battle of Peleliu. Sledge's book details his experiences and friendship with Shelton on Peleliu and Okinawa; and Shelton would give Sledge the nickname "Sledgehammer". He was discharged from the Marine Corps in 1946 with the rank of corporal.

Later life and death
He returned to Louisiana after the war and worked as an air conditioner repairman and in the lumber industry. He was married to Gladys Bowman-Shelton until his death and they had two sons, Allen and Floyd; the latter of which died before his father, in 1990. He and Sledge did not speak for over thirty-five years until he read Sledge's book and the two reunited.

Shelton died on May 3, 1993, in Jackson, Louisiana. Sledge was one of his pallbearers. He is buried at the Bowman-Dedon Cemetery, in West Feliciana Parish, Louisiana alongside his wife.

Shelton's home was later the residence of serial killer Derrick Todd Lee.

Awards
His decorations and medals include:

See also
List of U.S. Marines
List of people from Louisiana
Eugene Sledge
Romus Burgin

References

1922 births
1993 deaths
United States Marine Corps personnel of World War II
United States Marines
Cajun people
People from Louisiana